Flavia Lorena Benítez (born 3 December 1998) is an Argentine professional footballer and former futsal player who plays as a midfielder for Brazilian Série A1 club SE Palmeiras, on loan from Estudiantes de Buenos Aires, and the Argentina women's national team.

International career
Benítez was eligible to play for Argentina (birthplace) or Paraguay (parentage). Although her father wanted her to represent the latter, she was called up to the Albicelestes. She was a part of the Argentine squad at the 2015 South American U-20 Women's Championship. She made her senior debut for Argentina on 3 March 2019 in a 0–2 friendly loss against New Zealand.

Personal life
Benítez is gay. On 6 May 2019, her partner, Verónica Rivero, gave birth to their twins.  She is a supporter of San Lorenzo. Upon her arrival at Palmeiras in early February 2023, she was a victim of gender-related discriminatory comments by Brazilian fans.

References

1998 births
Living people
Sportspeople from Buenos Aires Province
Argentine women's footballers
Argentine women's futsal players
Argentine sportspeople of Paraguayan descent
Women's association football midfielders
Boca Juniors (women) footballers
Argentina women's international footballers
2019 FIFA Women's World Cup players
Argentine expatriate women's footballers
Argentine expatriate sportspeople in Brazil
Expatriate women's footballers in Brazil
Argentine LGBT sportspeople
Lesbian sportswomen
Argentine lesbians
LGBT association football players